Munster (  or  ) is one of the four provinces of Ireland, in the south of Ireland. In early Ireland, the Kingdom of Munster was one of the kingdoms of Gaelic Ireland ruled by a "king of over-kings". Following the Norman invasion of Ireland, the ancient kingdoms were shired into counties for administrative and judicial purposes. In later centuries, local government legislation has seen further sub-division of the historic counties.

Munster has no official function for local government purposes. For the purposes of the ISO, the province is listed as one of the provincial sub-divisions of the State (ISO 3166-2:IE) and coded as "IE-M". Other significant urban centres in the province include Limerick and Waterford.

History

In the early centuries AD, Munster was the domain of the Iverni peoples and the Clanna Dedad familial line, led by Cú Roí and to whom the king Conaire Mór also belonged. In the 5th century, Saint Patrick spent several years in the area and founded Christian churches and ordained priests. During the Early Middle Ages, most of the area was part of the Kingdom of Munster, ruled by the Eóganachta dynasty. Prior to this, the area was ruled by the Dáirine and Corcu Loígde overlords. Later rulers from the Eóganachta included Cathal mac Finguine and Feidlimid mac Cremthanin. Notable regional kingdoms and lordships of Early Medieval Munster were Iarmuman (West Munster), Osraige (Ossory), Uí Liatháin, Uí Fidgenti, Éile, Múscraige, Ciarraige Luachra, Corcu Duibne, Corcu Baiscinn, and Déisi Muman.

By the 9th century, the Gaels had been joined by Norse Vikings who founded towns such as Cork, Waterford and Limerick, for the most part, incorporated into a maritime empire by the Dynasty of Ivar, who periodically would threaten Munster with conquest in the next century. Around this period Ossory broke away from Munster. The Eóganachta dominated Munster until the 10th century, which saw the rise of the Dalcassian clan, who had earlier annexed Thomond, north of the River Shannon to Munster. Their leaders were the ancestors of the O'Brien dynasty and spawned Brian Boru, perhaps the most noted High King of Ireland, and several of whose descendants were also high kings.

By 1118, Munster had fractured into the Kingdom of Thomond under the O'Briens, the Kingdom of Desmond under the MacCarthy dynasty (Eóganachta), and the short-lived Kingdom of Ormond under the O'Kennedys (another Dalcassian sept). The three crowns of the flag of Munster represent these three late kingdoms.

There was Norman influence from the 14th century, including by the FitzGerald, de Clare and Butler houses, two of whom carved out earldoms within the Lordship of Ireland, the Earls of Desmond eventually becoming independent potentates, while the Earls of Ormond remained closer to England. The O'Brien of Thomond and MacCarthy of Desmond surrendered and regranted sovereignty to the Tudors in 1543 and 1565, joining the Kingdom of Ireland. The impactful Desmond Rebellions, led by the FitzGeralds, soon followed.

The area of Munster was then colonized in the mid to late 16th century by the British plantations of Ireland during the Tudor conquest of Ireland, a group known as the West Country Men played a role in the colonization of Munster, attempts to settle a joint stock colony at Kerrycurrihy in 1568 was made and Richard Grenville also seized lands for colonization at Tracton, to the west of Cork harbour.  The Munster plantation was the largest colonial venture of the English at the time.

By the mid-19th century much of the area was hit hard in the Great Famine, especially the west. The province was affected by events in the Irish War of Independence in the early 20th century, and there was a brief Munster Republic during the Irish Civil War.

The Irish leaders Michael Collins and earlier Daniel O'Connell came from families of the old Gaelic Munster gentry.

Culture

Noted for its traditions in Irish folk music, and with many ancient castles and monasteries in the province, Munster is a tourist destination. During the fifth century, St. Patrick spent seven years founding churches and ordaining priests in Munster, but a fifth-century bishop named Ailbe is the patron saint of Munster.

In Irish mythology, a number of ancient goddesses are associated with the province including Anann, Áine, Grian, Clíodhna, Aimend, Mór Muman, Bébinn, Aibell and Mongfind. The druid-god of Munster is Mug Ruith and Tlachtga is his daughter. Another legendary figure is Donn.

The province has long had trading and cultural links with continental Europe. The Corcu Loígde had a trading fleet active along the French Atlantic coast, as far south as Gascony, importing wine to Munster. The Eóganachta had ecclesiastical ties with Germany, which show in the architecture of their ceremonial capital at the Rock of Cashel.

The majority of Irish ogham inscriptions are found in Munster, principally in areas occupied by the Iverni, especially the Corcu Duibne. Later, Europe's first linguistic dictionary in any non-Classical language, the Sanas Cormaic, was compiled by Munster scholars, traditionally thought to have been directed by the king-bishop Cormac mac Cuilennáin (d. 908).

The School of Ross in Munster was one of Europe's leading centres of learning in the Early Middle Ages.

Sport
Several sports in Munster are organised on a provincial basis, or operate competitions along provincial lines. This includes traditionally popular sports such as hurling, Gaelic football, rugby union and soccer, as well as cricket (Munster Cricket Union), hockey (Munster Hockey Union), and others.

Hurling and football

Munster is noted for its tradition of hurling. Three of the four most successful teams in the All-Ireland Senior Hurling Championship are from Munster; Cork GAA, Tipperary GAA and Limerick GAA. The final of the Munster Senior Hurling Championship is one of the most important days in the Irish GAA calendar. Munster is the only province in Ireland wherein every one of its counties has won an All-Ireland Senior Hurling Championship.

Traditionally, the dominant teams in Munster football are Kerry GAA and Cork GAA, although Tipperary GAA and Limerick GAA have also won All-Ireland Senior Football Championships. Kerry in particular are the most successful county in the history of football.

Rugby union

Rugby is a popular game in the cities of Limerick and Cork. Munster Rugby is an Irish Rugby Football Union representative side which competes in the United Rugby Championship competition, winning in 2003, 2009 and 2011 and in the Heineken Cup, winning in 2006 and 2008. Until 2016, the Munster side was the only Irish side to have defeated the New Zealand All Blacks.

Soccer

Association football is also a popular game in Munster, with the Munster Football Association governing a number of aspects of the game in the province. Four Munster clubs play in the League of Ireland: Cork City F.C., Waterford FC in the League of Ireland Premier Division; and Cobh Ramblers and Treaty United F.C. in the First Division.

Cricket
In Cricket, the province is represented by the Munster Reds in the Inter-Provincial Cup one-day competition and the Inter-Provincial Trophy Twenty20 competition. Munster does not currently participate in the first-class inter-provincial tournament, though Cricket Ireland does have plans to include Munster in the format.

Irish language

The Irish language, or more specifically Munster Irish, is spoken as a first language in Gaeltachtaí (Irish speaking areas) in a number of areas in the province. This includes West Kerry (Corca Dhuibhne), South Kerry (Uíbh Ráthach), West Cork (Múscraí), south-west Cork (Oileán Cléire), and parts of Waterford (Gaeltacht na Rinne or Gaeltacht na nDéise).

There are about 35,000 Irish language speakers in Munster, with 9,737 native speakers in the Munster Gaeltacht areas of Cork, Kerry and Waterford. There are also 12,219 pupils attending 45 Gaelscoils (Irish language primary schools) and 15 Gaelcholáiste (Irish language secondary schools) in the province. As of the Census of Ireland 2011 there were 13,193 daily speakers outside the education system in Munster.

Divisions

The province is divided into six traditional counties: Clare, Cork, Kerry, Limerick, Tipperary and Waterford. Munster is the largest of Ireland's four provinces by land area, and the third largest by population.

Urban areas

Munster has many large towns (including a number of growing satellite towns) and is the province with the most cities in the Republic of Ireland. In order of size (2016 census figures; urban areas with over 10,000 inhabitants), with cities and county towns bolded:

Cork (208,669)
Limerick (94,192)
Waterford (53,504)
Ennis (25,276)
Tralee (23,691)
Ballincollig (18,621)
Clonmel (17,140)
Carrigaline (15,770)
Killarney (14,504)
Cobh (12,800)
Midleton (12,496)
Mallow (12,459)
Tramore (10,381)

Urban areas with 5,000–10,000 inhabitants:

Shannon (9,729)
Dungarvan (9,227)
Nenagh (8,968)
Youghal (7,963)
Thurles (7,940)
Bandon (6,957)
Newcastle West (6,619)
Fermoy (6,585)
Carrick on Suir (5,771)
Roscrea (5,446)
Carrigtwohill (5,080)
Tipperary (4,979)

Economy
2014 CSO figures indicated that GDP per capita in the province ranged from €28,094 in the South Tipperary/Waterford (South-East) region, to €50,544 in Cork and Kerry (South-West). Disposable income in the province was approximately €22,000 per person in 2008 - behind the Eastern and Dublin region (€25,000 per person) and ahead of the Border, Midland and Western regions (€20,000 per person).

Agriculture
Munster's agricultural industry centres around the Golden Vale pasturelands which cover counties Cork, Limerick and Tipperary. Kerry Group manufactures dairy products from the dairy cows of the region, and Glanbia is a food producer which operates an "innovation centre" in the region. Dawn Meats also operate from County Waterford.

Retail
Irish-owned retailer Dunnes Stores was founded in Cork, and Ireland's largest supermarket group, the Musgrave Group, is also based in Munster.

Employment
Large employers in the region include AOL, Bausch & Lomb, Dairygold, Dell, Amazon, Motorola, Amgen, Pfizer, Analog Devices, Fexco Financial Services, Vistakon, Waterford Crystal, Apple Computer, Intel, Novartis, O2, Lufthansa Technik, Kerry Group, Siemens, Sony and Blizzard Entertainment. The largest employment hub in Munster is Metropolitan Cork, where a number of multinational firms are located in the Cork city area, including at Little Island. The Shannon Free Zone, in County Clare and near Limerick city, is also a centre of employment.

In media

A number of television companies and studios have (or had) a Munster-focus. These include RTÉ Cork (RTÉ's regional studio in Cork), South Coast TV and Channel South. The latter transmitted local programming to Cork, Limerick, and parts of Kerry, Waterford, Clare and Tipperary.

Apart from the local city or regional newspapers, a number of print outlets focus or market themselves on a provincial basis. These include the Avondhu (covering parts of Cork, Waterford, Limerick and Tipperary), the Nationalist & Munster Advertiser, the Munster Express, and others.

See also
 Provinces of Ireland
 New Munster Province
 Wild Atlantic Way

Notes
This is the cities' urban area populations and not city proper

County Tipperary has two county towns, following the 2014 amalgamation of North Tipperary County Council and South Tipperary County Council

References

External links

 

 
Provinces of Ireland